Ngararatunua or Ngāraratunua is a semi-rural community on the outskirts of Whangarei, in the Northland Region of New Zealand's North Island.

The local Ngāraratunua Marae and Te Paea Soldiers' Memorial Hall is a meeting place of the Ngāpuhi hapū of Ngāti Hau, Ngāti Hine, Te Parawhau and Ngāti Kahu o Torongare.

References

Whangarei District
Suburbs of Whangārei
Populated places in the Northland Region